James or Jim Wiggins may refer to:

James Wiggins (American football), American football player
James Russell Wiggins (1903–2000), American editor and ambassador
James "Boodle It" Wiggins, American blues singer and musician
Jim Wiggins (actor) (1922–1999), English TV actor
James Wiggin Coe (1909–c. 1946), American naval officer